Jared Schutz Polis (born May 12, 1975) is an American politician, entrepreneur, businessman, and philanthropist serving as the 43rd governor of Colorado since 2019. He was the only Democratic member of the libertarian conservative Liberty Caucus, and was the third-wealthiest member of Congress, with an estimated net worth of $122.6 million. He was elected governor of Colorado in 2018 and reelected in a landslide in 2022.

As an openly gay man, Polis has made history several times through his electoral success. In 2008, he became the first openly gay parent elected to Congress. In 2018, he became the first openly gay man and second openly LGBT person (after Kate Brown) elected governor of a U.S. state. He is also the first Jew elected governor of Colorado. In 2021, he became the first U.S. governor in a same-sex marriage. In 2022, he became the first openly gay man and the first U.S. governor in a same-sex marriage to be reelected.

Early life and education
Polis is the son of Stephen Schutz and Susan Polis Schutz, founders of greeting card and book publisher Blue Mountain Arts. He was born at Boulder Community Hospital in Boulder, Colorado, in 1975. He lived in San Diego, California, as a high school student, graduating from La Jolla Country Day School in three years with multiple honors. He graduated from Princeton University with a B.A. in politics in 1996, writing a 157-page senior thesis, "Paradigm Shift: Politics in the Information Age", under the supervision of Carol M. Swain. While at Princeton, Polis served as communications director of the undergraduate student government and was involved in other campus organizations, such as Model Congress and the Princeton Juggling Club. In 2000, he legally changed his surname to his mother's to raise awareness for a fundraiser and because he simply "liked it better".

Business career
Polis co-founded American Information Systems (AIS), Inc., while still in college. AIS was an internet access provider and was sold in 1998. In 1996, he co-founded a free electronic greeting card website, bluemountain.com, which was sold to Excite@Home in 1999 for $430 million in stock and $350 million in cash.

In February 1998, Polis founded ProFlowers, an online florist, in La Jolla, California. In December of that year, economist Arthur Laffer began advising Polis and joined ProFlowers as a Director. ProFlowers, later renamed Provide Commerce, Inc., went public on NASDAQ as PRVD on December 17, 2003. In 2005, Provide Commerce was acquired by media conglomerate Liberty Media Corporation for $477 million.

Polis and other investors founded TechStars in Boulder, Colorado, in 2006.

During his tenure in Congress, Polis was among its wealthiest members; his net worth was estimated at over $300 million.

Philanthropic career
Polis is the founder of the Jared Polis Foundation. The foundation issues annual Teacher Recognition Awards and donates computers to schools and nonprofit organizations. Polis has also founded one charter school (the New America School) and co-founded another (the Academy of Urban Learning).

Polis has received the Boulder Daily Camera's 2007 Pacesetter Award in Education and the Kauffman Foundation Community Award.

Early political career
Polis has been called one of the "Gang of Four"—four wealthy Coloradans who made a concerted effort to support Democrats in statewide legislative races. The other members are Pat Stryker, Rutt Bridges, and Tim Gill. The Gang of Four's influence has been cited as a factor in Colorado's shift toward the Democratic Party in the 2000s and 2010s.

State Board of Education

In 2000, Polis was elected at-large as a member of the Colorado State Board of Education and served a single six-year term until January 2007, when the district was eliminated. His election was one of the closest in Colorado history, as he defeated incumbent Ben Alexander by 90 votes out of 1.6 million cast. During his term, Polis served as both chairman and vice chairman of the board.

Ballot measures
In 2006, Polis served as co-chair of Coloradans for Clean Government, a committee that supported Amendment 41, a citizen-initiated ballot measure to ban gifts by registered lobbyists to government officials, establish a $50 annual restriction on gift-giving from non-lobbyists, establish a two-year cooling-off period before former state legislators and statewide elected officials can begin lobbying, and create an independent ethics commission. In November 2006, 62.3% of Colorado voters approved the "Ethics in Government" constitutional amendment.

In 2007, Polis co-chaired the "Building for Our Future" campaign that supported ballot question 3A in the Boulder Valley School District to issue $296.8 million in bonds for the improvement and modernization of aging school facilities—the largest capital construction bond issue in the district's history and the largest school bond proposal in Colorado that year. In November 2006, 58% of Boulder Valley School District voters approved the measure.

In 2014, Polis planned to champion two ballot measures to limit fracking in Colorado by banning drilling near schools and homes and empowering communities to pass their own rules. The measures were dropped after he reached a deal with Governor John Hickenlooper to create a task force. The absence of the initiatives was seen as a relief to vulnerable Democrats who would have had to take controversial stances on the issue.

U.S. House of Representatives

Elections

In 2008, Polis won a heavily contested Democratic primary election for Colorado's 2nd congressional district, and went on to win the general election on November 4 with 63% of the vote. He succeeded Mark Udall, who was elected to the United States Senate that year. Polis was reelected to the House in 2010 with 57% of the vote, in 2012 with 56% of the vote, in 2014 with 57% of the vote, and in 2016 with 57% of the vote.

Tenure

Polis was the Red to Blue program chair for the DCCC during the 2012 elections, helping recruit and raise money for Democratic candidates in competitive congressional districts. After the elections, he considered running for vice chair of the House Democratic Caucus after then-Chair Xavier Becerra was term-limited. The position went to Representative Joe Crowley.

Legislation sponsored
The following is an incomplete list of legislation Polis introduced:

 The Affordable College Textbook Act had been introduced in the 113th and 114th Congresses. Reintroduced by Polis in the 115th Congress, it again died in committee.

Committee assignments
In the 114th Congress, Polis served on the following committees:
Committee on Education and the Workforce
Subcommittee on Higher Education and Workforce Training
Subcommittee on Health, Employment, Labor, and Pensions
Committee on Natural Resources
Subcommittee on Energy and Mineral Resources
Subcommittee on Federal Lands
Subcommittee on Oversight and Investigations
Committee on Rules
Subcommittee on Legislative and Budget Process

Caucus memberships
Congressional Cannabis Caucus
Congressional Progressive Caucus
LGBT Equality Caucus (co-chair)
Blockchain Caucus (co-chair)
Mexico Caucus (co-chair)
Nepal Caucus (co-chair)
Veterinary Medicine Caucus
New Democrat Coalition
Congressional Arts Caucus
Congressional NextGen 9-1-1 Caucus
NO PAC Caucus
Liberty Caucus
U.S.-Japan Caucus
Problem Solvers Caucus

Governor of Colorado

Elections

2018

In 2018, Polis announced his candidacy for governor of Colorado. He was elected governor with 53.4% of the vote, defeating Republican nominee Walker Stapleton and becoming the first openly gay person elected governor of any state; the first openly gay person to serve as a state governor was Jim McGreevey, the 52nd Governor of New Jersey, who disclosed his sexual orientation during his gubernatorial tenure.

2022

Polis won reelection to a second term, defeating Republican nominee Heidi Ganahl, a member of the University of Colorado Board of Regents.

Tenure
Polis was elected governor on November 6, 2018. Boldly Forward, a 501(c)4 nonprofit, was formed as the transition team, working with Keystone Center as facilitator. Polis was sworn in on January 8, 2019. An effort to recall him and other Democratic elected officials failed to submit any signatures; Polis said of the effort, "Recalls should not be used for partisan gamesmanship".

Political positions

Campus safety
In September 2015, Polis voiced support for altering university disciplinary processes surrounding campus rape to allow for cases to be judged against a reasonable likelihood standard, saying that: "If there are 10 people who have been accused, and under a reasonable likelihood standard maybe one or two did it, it seems better to get rid of all 10 people ... we're not talking about depriving them of life or liberty, we're talking about them being transferred to another university, for crying out loud." After being criticized for these remarks, Polis apologized, saying that: "I went too far by implying that I support expelling innocent students from college campuses, which is something neither I nor other advocates of justice for survivors of sexual assault support".

Civil liberties

In the House, Polis was an advocate for civil liberties, saying while campaigning in 2008 that "balance must be restored between the executive and the judicial branch (through restoring habeas corpus, and clarifying that the president does not have the Constitutional authority to alter legislation through signing statements) and between the executive and the legislative branch (clarifying that the Fourth Amendment requires probable cause and a warrant for the government to monitor Americans)".

Some have heralded Polis as a libertarian due to his positions on abortion rights, school choice, allowing children to play unsupervised, COVID mandates, and supporting an income tax rate of "zero."

Cannabis
Polis supports the legalization of cannabis, saying in 2011, "Just as the policy of prohibition failed nationally with alcohol—it's now up to states and counties—I think we should do the same with marijuana." Legislation he has introduced includes the Ending Federal Marijuana Prohibition Act in 2013, the Regulate Marijuana Like Alcohol Act in 2015, and the McClintock–Polis amendment in 2015 (to prevent federal interference in states that have legalized medical or recreational use; it failed 206–222). He was also an original cosponsor of the Marijuana Justice Act that was first introduced in the House in 2018. In February 2017, Polis launched the Congressional Cannabis Caucus along with Representatives Don Young, Earl Blumenauer, and Dana Rohrabacher. In 2021, he pardoned 1,351 Coloradans convicted of marijuana possession.

Internet piracy
Polis supports an open and free internet, and has been critical of SOPA, PIPA and CISPA, saying in an interview with Forbes, "I oppose piracy and want to see intellectual property protected because that is what fosters and rewards innovation. But SOPA won't accomplish a meaningful reduction in piracy and causes massive collateral damage to the Internet ecosystem." While debating SOPA on the House floor Polis said that SOPA and PIPA "directly threaten the very internet that has brought humanity great prosperity and greater peace" and "Allowing the military and NSA to spy on Americans on American soil goes against every principle this country was founded on." Polis and 167 other House members voted against CISPA.

Polis and Representatives Zoe Lofgren and Darrell Issa sponsored Aaron's Law in the wake of the suicide of computer programmer and internet activist Aaron Swartz, the co-founder of Reddit, who was facing computer and wire fraud charges, more than 30 years in prison and fines of over $1 million for violating the terms of service for illegally downloading academic journal articles from the digital library JSTOR. The proposed bill would exclude terms of service violations from the 1986 Computer Fraud and Abuse Act and from the wire fraud statute. Polis said that the charges brought by US Attorney Carmen Ortiz were "ridiculous and trumped-up" and that "It's absurd that he was made a scapegoat. I would hope that this doesn't happen to anyone else."

NDAA
Polis voted against the 2012 National Defense Authorization Act, and opposes Section 1021, which has drawn controversy about implications to detention policy. After the law was signed, Polis and other House members introduced legislation to repeal the indefinite detention provision. Though legislation has failed to pass the House, Section 1021 is now pending in the courts.

Patriot Act
Polis has been a vocal opponent of the PATRIOT ACT. In a letter to House Speaker John Boehner, he wrote that the Act "is a bill that has been plagued with abuse since it was first passed, and today's rule is yet another example of short-circuiting the system that our Founding Fathers set up. If there were ever the need for the close supervision and congressional oversight of a law, it is a law that discusses how and under what conditions a government can spy on its own citizens." In February 2011, Polis voted against H.R. 514, extending expiring provisions of the Patriot Act, authorizing court-approved roving wiretaps that permit surveillance on multiple phones, allowing court-approved seizure of records and property in anti-terrorism operations, and permitting surveillance against a so-called lone wolf, a non-US citizen engaged in terrorism who may not be part of a recognized terrorist group.

Cryptocurrency 
In May 2014, Polis became the first U.S. representative to accept campaign donations via Bitcoin.

Education
In 2011, Polis and Senator Joe Lieberman introduced the 2011 Race to the Top Act (H.R. 1532). The legislation authorized old provisions and some new ones, including new standards to encourage and reward states based on their implementation of comprehensive educational reforms that innovate through 4-year competitive grants that allow more funding to expand charter schools and compensate teachers in part based on their students' performance.

Polis has sponsored other education bills and legislation regarding students, including:
 The SLICE (School Lunch Improvements for Children's Education) Act, in response to Congress redefining pizza as a vegetable. The SLICE Act would require healthier meals for students, which would, for example, allow the USDA to accurately count 1/8 of a cup of tomato paste as 1/8 of a cup, instead of half of a cup, which is what qualifies pizza as a vegetable; allow the USDA to implement science-based sodium reduction targets; and allow the USDA to set a whole grain requirement. The SLICE Act is opposed by The American Frozen Food Institute, which claims that it "all but removes foods made with tomato paste from school cafeterias, in spite of the significant nutritional value offered by tomato paste." Polis has said, "Pizza has a place in school meals, but equating it with broccoli, carrots and celery seriously undermines this nation's efforts to support children's health." He added that agribusiness should never dictate the quality of school meals.
 The Defending Special Education Students and Families Act, which fully funds the Individuals with Disabilities Education Act (IDEA). IDEA governs how states and public agencies provide early intervention for special education. In the original bill, IDEA promised to pay 40% of the excess cost of educating students with disabilities, but that funding provision hasn't been fulfilled and only covers 16% of special-education funding and has never funded more than 30%. Polis's bill suggests cutting excess and wasteful Pentagon spending by cutting $18.8 billion in weapons systems over five years.

Polis has also introduced the Computer Science Education Act, which helps provide job training for computing jobs, and the ACE Act, which would provide funding to improve outcomes for students in persistently low-performing schools, and to authorize school "turnaround grants."

Energy 
In 2014, Polis sponsored two ballot measures targeting hydraulic fracturing, Initiatives 88 and 89. On August 4, 2014, Polis announced that he would withdraw his support for the two ballot measures.

Food safety
Polis has shown interest in the regulation of kombucha. He co-sponsored a bill that would have legalized the interstate shipment of raw milk.

Foreign policy

Afghanistan
Polis supported removing all troops from Afghanistan. In 2010, he supported a failed resolution to withdraw all troops from Afghanistan within 30 days, saying, "I don't believe that this ongoing occupation is in our national interest" and "I supported the initial action to oust the Taliban in Afghanistan, and that succeeded. The challenge we face now is a stateless menace."

Polis also took a congressional delegation trip to Afghanistan, meeting with former Afghan Interior Minister Mohammad Hanif Atmar, U.S. military officials and diplomats. During his meeting with Atmar, Polis focused on the education gap between Afghanistan and Western nations, the low literacy rate for Afghan police and military officials, and combating political corruption. Polis criticized expanding U.S. troops in Afghanistan, and supported putting resources in intelligence and special operations. In a report after visiting Afghanistan, he said, "We need all the high-level diplomatic support we can to master the diplomatic complexities of fighting against an enemy holed up in two countries, as well as navigating the complex regional politics", adding: "Our best estimates show there to be no more than 5,000 al-Qaeda fighters in Afghanistan and Pakistan. They operate out of areas in southern and eastern Afghanistan and on the Pakistan/Afghanistan border. Do we really need to occupy an entire country of around 30 million people to root out 5,000 enemies? I harbor a deep degree of ambivalence about the military surge. The diplomatic surge is good, increasing our covert ops and intelligence abilities focused on al-Qaeda is good, but adding tens of thousands of American troops for years doesn't necessarily get us closer to defeating al-Qaeda."

Iran
Polis voted for the 2010 Comprehensive Iran Sanctions, Accountability, and Divestment Act expanding economic sanctions against Iran under the Iran and Libya Sanctions Act, and co-sponsored the Iran Sanctions Enabling Act of 2009, authorizing state and local governments to direct divestiture from, and prevent investment in, companies with investments of $20,000,000 or more in Iran's energy sector.

Iraq
Polis opposed the Iraq War, saying, "The invasion of Iraq was a colossal mistake and I opposed the war from the very beginning. Bush's blunders, and the Democrats who gave him cover along the way, have left us without easy solutions for improving the situation." During a congressional trip to Iraq, he praised the "Sons of Iraq" policy, which funds former military and police officials under Saddam Hussein to lay down their arms against coalition forces, patrol neighborhoods, and fight other Sunni insurgents. In an op-ed, he wrote, "If we had started this policy sooner after the invasion, we no doubt could have prevented loss of life. As can be expected, some of them turn out to be corrupt and attack us anyway, but most seem to be helping to keep the order. The challenge is to bring them into the fold of the new Iraqi government and a proper chain of command structure."

In the op-ed, Polis also wrote, "The hippie in me bemoans the fact that we defeated the Iraqi military only to help them build an even stronger one that might one day be used against children and innocents, as often is the case. When will all the killing end? Where have all the flowers gone? And they shall beat their swords into plowshares and they shall study war no more."

Human rights
As a member of Congress, Polis and then-Representatives Barney Frank and Tammy Baldwin called on the U.S. embassy in Iraq and then-United States Secretary of State Hillary Clinton to prioritize investigating the allegations of rape, torture and executions of LGBT Iraqis, saying, "Such disturbing violations of human rights should not be ignored and the United States should not stand idly by while billions of taxpayer dollars are used to support their government."

Polis and 35 other House members also called on the State Department to address violence against Honduras's LGBT community.

Immigration 
On May 29, 2019, Polis signed House Bill 1124, immediately prohibiting law enforcement officials in Colorado from holding undocumented immigrants solely on the basis of a request from U.S. Immigration and Customs Enforcement.

Polis is one of several U.S. governors who have been relocating migrants via publicly sponsored buses to other U.S. cities, including New York City and Chicago. On January 7, 2023, he said he would no longer send migrants to Chicago.

LGBT rights
At the time of his departure from Congress, Polis was one of seven openly gay members of the 113th Congress, and caucused in the LGBT Equality Caucus. He pushed for the repeal of the Defense of Marriage Act, and praised the Obama Administration's decision for the Justice Department to no longer defend DOMA, saying, "Section 3 of the law is unconstitutional." In a statement Polis said, "I applaud the Administration for finally recognizing what my colleagues and I have long criticized, to deny people the ability to officially acknowledge their relationship and feel welcomed as partners only for being LGBT is absurd and today's decision confirms this". Polis also credited Obama for openly endorsing gay marriage, calling it "welcome news to American families."

Polis was an original cosponsor of H.R. 116, the Respect for Marriage Act. H.R. 116 repeals DOMA, allowing marriage recognition for gay and lesbian couples in the US, the District of Columbia, and US territories.

Polis was also the leading sponsor of the Student Non-Discrimination Act with Senator Al Franken, who introduced the act in the Senate. SNDA would establish a comprehensive federal non-discrimination prohibition in all public and elementary and secondary schools based on sexual orientation and gender identity, expanding Title IX of the Education Amendments Act to LGBT students. In a statement, Polis said "education is the right of every student" regardless of their actual or perceived sexual orientation or gender identity. "The alarming increase in teen suicides has shown us just how far we are from making our children's schools safe spaces." The SNDA has 167 co-sponsors in the House, with only two Republicans signing on. SNDA is also supported by the ACLU and Change.org.

Polis voted for the repeal of Don't Ask, Don't Tell, which prohibited openly gay and lesbian members of the Military from serving. In a letter to Obama, Polis and 67 other House members urged for the repeal of Don't Ask, Don't Tell. The letter cited a California district judge's ruling that DADT was unconstitutional and the 14,000 service members who had been discharged from the military since its passage.

In a press release on the repeal of DADT, Polis said: "The repeal of Don't Ask, Don't Tell is a victory for the cause of equality and our national defense. For too long, this wrongheaded policy prevented brave Americans from serving in our military and defending our country just because of who they love. It undermined our national security by forcing gays and lesbians out of the military service at a time when America needs the most talented and the bravest protecting us, regardless of their orientation."

Polis was also a supporter and cosponsor of the Matthew Shepard and James Byrd, Jr. Hate Crimes Prevention Act, giving adequate funding and ability to federal authorities to investigate hate crimes, and advocated for protections against LGBT victims of domestic violence to be included in the Violence Against Women Act.

In September 2014, Polis filed a discharge petition to bring the LGBT Employment Non-Discrimination Act to the floor of the House of Representatives for a proper vote. Representatives Garamenedi, Holt, and Connolly joined Polis in support in filing the petition. The revised legislation includes narrow religious exemptions.

Polis urged Obama to reconsider the inclusion of Malaysia and Brunei in a Trans-Pacific Partnership because of their negative record on LGBT rights.

In April 2022, Polis said he opposed the repeal of the Reedy Creek Improvement Act and said he would welcome Disney if they left Florida and moved to Colorado.

Libertarianism
Polis has been described as America's most libertarian governor. He was the first member of Congress to accept Bitcoin donations, and supports school choice initiatives and eliminating Colorado's income tax.

Personal life

Polis is one of the few people to be openly gay when first elected to the House, and the first openly gay parent in Congress. He is also the nation's second openly gay parent to hold state-level government office. Polis and his husband, Marlon Reis, have a son and a daughter, born in 2011 and 2014, respectively. Polis is Jewish.

In June 2019, to mark the 50th anniversary of the Stonewall riots, an event widely considered a watershed moment in the modern LGBTQ rights movement, Queerty named Polis one of the Pride50 "trailblazing individuals who actively ensure society remains moving towards equality, acceptance and dignity for all queer people".

Polis enjoys video games such as League of Legends. His favorite champions include Maokai and Anivia. He is also an avid Colorado Rockies and Denver Broncos fan.

In July 2020, Polis donated $1000 to Representative Ilhan Omar's primary opponent in her 2020 reelection campaign.

In September 2021, Polis married his longtime partner, Marlon Reis, in a small Jewish ceremony with family and a few friends at a synagogue in Boulder.

Electoral history

|-
| colspan=15 |
|-
!Year
!Winning candidate
!Party
!Pct
!Opponent
!Party
!Pct
!Opponent
!Party
!Pct
!Opponent
!Party
!Pct
|-
|2008
| |Jared Polis
| |Democratic
| |63%
| |Scott Starin
| |Republican
| |34%
| |J. A. Calhoun
| |Green
| |2%
|  |Bill Hammons
|  |Unity
|  |1%
|-
|2010
| |Jared Polis
| |Democratic
| |57%
| |Stephen Bailey
| |Republican
| |38%
| |Jenna Goss
| |Constitution
| |3%
| |Curtis Harris
| |Libertarian
| |2%
|-
|2012
| |Jared Polis
| |Democratic
| |56%
| |Kevin Lundberg
| |Republican
| |39%
| |Randy Luallin
| |Libertarian
| |3%
| |Susan P. Hall
| |Green
| |2%
|-
|2014
| |Jared Polis
| |Democratic
| |57%
| |George Leing
| |Republican
| |43%
|
|
|
|
|
|
|-
|2016
| |Jared Polis
| |Democratic
| |57%
| |Nic Morse
| |Republican
| |37%
| |Richard Longstreth
| |Libertarian
| |6%
|
|-

See also
 Congressional Progressive Caucus
 Libertarian Democrat
 List of Jewish members of the United States Congress
 List of LGBT members of the United States Congress
 List of openly LGBT heads of government
 List of the first LGBT holders of political offices in the United States

References

External links

Governor Jared Polis official government website
Jared Polis for Colorado campaign website

|-

|-

|-

|-

|-

|-

1975 births
20th-century American businesspeople
20th-century American Jews
21st-century American Jews
21st-century American businesspeople
21st-century American politicians
American Reform Jews
American libertarians
American people of Russian-Jewish descent
Businesspeople from Colorado
Cooperative advocates
Democratic Party governors of Colorado
Democratic Party members of the United States House of Representatives from Colorado
Gay Jews
Gay politicians
Jewish American people in Colorado politics
Jewish American state governors of the United States
Jewish members of the United States House of Representatives
LGBT members of the United States Congress
LGBT people from Colorado
LGBT state governors of the United States
Living people
Philanthropists from Colorado
Politicians from Boulder, Colorado
Princeton University alumni
School board members in Colorado
Jewish American philanthropists